PA-32 may refer to:
 Pennsylvania's 32nd congressional district
 Pennsylvania Route 32 - a highway
 Piper PA-32 Cherokee Six light aircraft